or Tokyo Subway is a third-sector organization with funding from the government of Tokyo and others. It was established on July 28, 1988, for projects related to the construction of the Toei Oedo Line. It was capitalized at 3 billion yen, including 2 billion from the government of Tokyo.

In 2004, it reported debts exceeding 527 billion yen.

Notes
Chikaken web page 経営状況 (Operating conditions) (in Japanese)

External links
Chikaken Web Site (in Japanese)

Construction and civil engineering companies based in Tokyo
Government-owned companies based in Tokyo
Construction Company
Construction and civil engineering companies established in 1988
Japanese companies established in 1988